Tibor Jakosits (born 18 March 1938) is a Hungarian former sports shooter. He competed in two events at the 1964 Summer Olympics.

References

1938 births
Living people
Hungarian male sport shooters
Olympic shooters of Hungary
Shooters at the 1964 Summer Olympics
Sport shooters from Budapest